Leonard Jay Mirman (March 19, 1940September 6, 2017) was an American mathematician and economist. He was the Paul G. McIntire Professor of Economics at the University of Virginia. Mirman was known for his contributions to economics of uncertainty.

A native of New York City, Mirman earned a bachelor's (1963) and a master's degree (1965) in mathematics from Brooklyn College and New York University, respectively. Then he enrolled at the University of Rochester, majoring in economics. He received his MA in June 1968, and his Ph.D. in 1970.

While still a graduate student, Mirman started a paper with William A. Brock, who was then an assistant professor in the department, that augmented the Ramsey–Cass–Koopmans model with stochastic technology progress. As business cycle fluctuations arise naturally in this setup, the Brock–Mirman model became the foundation of real business cycle theory, which is at the heart of modern macroeconomics and growth theory.

References

External links 
 Website at University of Virginia
 

1940 births
2017 deaths
21st-century American economists
Brooklyn College alumni
New York University alumni
University of Rochester alumni
University of Virginia faculty
Fellows of the Econometric Society